Bay Olympic is an association football club based in New Lynn,  Auckland, New Zealand. They currently compete in the Northern League.

They have won the NRFL Premier League three times.

History
The club was formed from the merger of Blockhouse Bay (founded 1948) and Green Bay-Titirangi United (founded 1973) in 1998. Blockhouse Bay had been a prominent Auckland team, and were winners of the 1970 Chatham Cup, and losing finalists in 1975. Bay Olympic were losing finalists of the 2010 Chatham Cup. They made it to the semi-final stage of the Chatham Cup for 2011 and also won the 2011 NRFL Premier League.

Present day
Bay Olympic ended the 2018 Lotto Sport Italia NRFL Premier in the 12th spot, being relegated to Division One.

Current squad

References

External links
New Zealand 2004/05 Season Results
Club website
Aucklandfootball.org.nz Bay olympic page

Association football clubs in Auckland
1998 establishments in New Zealand
Sport in West Auckland, New Zealand